Taller is a commune in the Landes department in Nouvelle-Aquitaine in southwestern France.

William II Sánchez of Gascony perpetrated a major defeat of the Vikings at Taller in 982 and they vanished as a serious threat thereafter.

Population

Etymology 
The origins of the name "Taller" are still uncertain but might come from the English word "tall", which could be related to the altitude of the village from which went from 70 to 90m in 982. Taller used to be called Talleyras.

History 

Legends say that in 982 Guillaume Sanche duc d'Aquitaine (Gascogne) fought and won against the Normans (Vikings).

During World War II, Taller used to be a German ammunition depot.

Geography 
Taller is located in France, in Nouvelle-Aquitaine in the Landes department, near Dax  Pilgrims walk through the village because it is part of the "Chemin de Compostelle" (Compostelle Way).

Education 
There is a primary school in Taller; however children over 7 years old have to attend another school located in Lesgor. There is also a Music school next to the primary school.

Heritage buildings 

There is an old wash house and a 16th-century "Saint Barthélemy" church.

Sport 
In Taller there is a football club a bowling (pétanque) patch, tennis courts, and a has  boxing club, a Tai-Chi club and a yoga club.

See also
 Communes of the Landes department

References

External links
Taller, notre village

Communes of Landes (department)